Daniele Bernasconi (born 13 August 1992) is an Italian footballer who plays for ASD Vigor Carpaneto.

Biography
Born in Albano Laziale, Lazio region, Bernasconi started his career at Serie D club Cynthia. On 1 February 2010 he was signed by Serie A club Parma F.C. in temporary deal. The deal became definitive in summer 2010. From 2011 to 2013 he left for Fondi in temporary deal. On 10 July 2013 Bernasconi and Pedrinelli were signed by Renate.

On 5 August 2014 Bernasconi, Cacchioli and Maccarrone were signed by L'Aquila in temporary deals. On 2 February 2015 Bernasconi was signed by Monza.

References

External links
 AIC profile (data by football.it) 
 

Italian footballers
Parma Calcio 1913 players
S.S. Racing Club Fondi players
A.C. Renate players
L'Aquila Calcio 1927 players
A.C. Monza players
Serie C players
Association football midfielders
People from Albano Laziale
Footballers from Lazio
1992 births
Living people
Sportspeople from the Metropolitan City of Rome Capital